This list give the names of British prime ministers by their birthplace.

45 of the past 57 prime ministers were born in England, including the incumbent Rishi Sunak. Of them, eighteen were born in Central London, most recently David Cameron (2010–2016). The rest were born in Scotland (7), Republic of Ireland (2), Canada (1) and United States (1). The most recent prime minister born in Scotland was Gordon Brown (2007–2010). 

No prime minister has ever been born in Wales, Northern Ireland or the West Country.

Four prime ministers were born outside the modern United Kingdom, the most recent being Boris Johnson (2019–2022).

List

References

See also 

 List of prime ministers of Australia by birthplace

Lists of prime ministers of the United Kingdom
prime_ministers_of_the_United_Kingdom_by_birthplace
Lists of prime ministers by place of birth